The 2008 Women's Indoor Pan American Cup was the 4th edition of the Indoor Pan American Cup, an indoor hockey competition. The tournament was held in San Juan, Argentina, from 19–23 November.

Argentina won the tournament for the first time, defeating the United States 4–2 in the final. Mexico won the bronze medal after defeating Peru 1–0 in the third place match.

Teams
The following eight teams competed for the title:

Results

Preliminary round

Fixtures

Classification round

Fifth and sixth place

First to fourth place classification

Semi-finals

Third and fourth place

Final

Awards

Statistics

Final standings

Goalscorers

References

External links
Pan American Hockey Federation

Women's Indoor Pan American Cup
Indoor Pan American Cup
Indoor Pan American Cup
Indoor Pan American Cup
International women's field hockey competitions hosted by Argentina
San Juan, Argentina
Pan American Cup